Taikona is a genus of moths in the family Sesiidae. It contains the single species Taikona matsumurai.

References

Sesiidae
Monotypic moth genera